James Moffat (born 18 June 1984) is an Australian professional racing driver who competed in the Virgin Australia Supercars Championship. In 2018 he drove for Wall Racing in the Porsche Carrera Cup Australia Championship. Moffat also races as a co-driver for Tickford Racing in the Pirtek Enduro Cup in a Ford Mustang GT, alongside Cameron Waters.

Biography
Moffat, son of touring car legend Allan Moffat, first appeared as a racing driver at club level before moving up to national level racing in a one-make series for Lotus Elise production cars, finishing runner-up in a tight championship fight, before graduating into V8 Utes in 2005.

After a lean 2006, Moffat returned in 2007 in a Sonic Motor Racing Services liveried Mygale in the Australian Formula Ford Championship and despite little previous open wheel experience finished third in the championship in his rookie season. With the same team Moffat progressed to the Carrera Cup where he again ran at the front of the field, competing against his half-brother Andrew Moffat, among others.

Co-inciding with the collapse of Carrera Cup, Moffat moved into Team Sonic's newly established V8 Supercar program and finished second in the 2009 Fujitsu V8 Supercar series. At the season ending V8 Supercar prizegiving Moffat received the Mike Kable Young Gun Award, recognition of his efforts as a first year V8 Supercar driver.

In late January 2011, Dick Johnson Racing announced the signing of Moffat to pilot the number 18 car vacated by the HRT-bound James Courtney. It was the first time in 22 years that the Moffat name has competed in the top level of Australian Touring Car racing.

Moffat remained with DJR for the following year before joining Kelly Racing as the team transitioned to Nissan Motorsport racing Nissan Altimas. Moffat quickly established himself within the new team, coming home first ahead of team-mate Michael Caruso at Winton.

His second placing with co-driver Taz Douglas at the 2014 Bathurst 1000 is his best finish to date at Mount Panorama—a remarkable achievement considering his Altima made contact with the tyre wall at the top of Mountain Straight on two occasions during the race.

Career results

Supercars Championship results

Bathurst 1000 results

Gallery

References

External links 
 
 
 

1984 births
Formula Ford drivers
Living people
Racing drivers from Melbourne
Supercars Championship drivers
Australian people of Canadian descent
V8SuperTourer drivers
Nismo drivers
Kelly Racing drivers
Garry Rogers Motorsport drivers
Dick Johnson Racing drivers